Henri Gabriel Guist'hau (15 September 1863, Saint-Pierre, Réunion – 27 November 1931, Nantes, France) was a French politician.

Guist'hau left Réunion for Nantes to study law there, and was elected to be mayor of Nantes in 1908. He went on to become a deputy of the Assemblée nationale from 1910 to 1924. He was minister of Public Instruction and Fine Arts in 1912, minister of Commerce and Industry in 1913, and finally, minister of the Navy in 1921. As minister of the Navy, he oversaw the reconstruction of the French Navy, after the ravages of the First World War. He was elevated to Officer of the Légion d'honneur in 1924.

References

1863 births
1931 deaths
People from Saint-Pierre, Réunion
Radical Party (France) politicians
Democratic Republican Alliance politicians
French Ministers of National Education
French Ministers of Commerce and Industry
Ministers of Marine
Members of the 10th Chamber of Deputies of the French Third Republic
Members of the 11th Chamber of Deputies of the French Third Republic
Members of the 12th Chamber of Deputies of the French Third Republic
Mayors of Nantes
Officiers of the Légion d'honneur